The swimming competitions at the 1968 Summer Olympics in Mexico City took place from 17 to 26 October at the Alberca Olímpica Francisco Márquez. Swimming featured a record total of 29 events.  There was a total of 468 participants from 51 countries competing.  The United States dominated the competition, winning 52 of 87 possible medals. 15-year-old American phenom Debbie Meyer from Maryland won three gold medals.

Events
Swimming at the 1968 Olympics featured a total of 29 events (15 for men and 14 for women). This was a significant increase from the 18 events contested in the previous Olympic Games. The following events were contested (all pool events are long course, and distances are in meters):
Freestyle: 100, 200, 400, and 1,500 (men's); 100, 200, 400 and 800 (women's)
Backstroke: 100 and 200;
Breaststroke: 100 and 200;
Butterfly: 100 and 200;
Individual medley: 200 and 400;
Relays: 4×100 free, 4×200 free, 4×100 medley (men's); 4×100 free, 4×100 medley (women's)

Participating nations
468 swimmers from 51 nations competed.

Medal table

Medal summary

Men's events

Women's events

Gallery of the medalists 
Some of the Olympic medalists in Mexico City:

References

 
1968
1968 Summer Olympics events
1968 in swimming